Acting Brigadier John Anderson Barstow MC (2 May 1893 – 3 January 1941) was a British Army officer, the brother of Major-General Arthur Edward Barstow and son of Lieutenant Colonel Thomas Adam Anderson Barstow of the Seaforth Highlanders and Jane Cape Barstow.

John Barstow was born 2 May 1893 and died 3 January 1941. He joined the British Army and was commissioned as a second lieutenant into the Argyll and Sutherland Highlanders, transferred to the Black Watch (Royal Highlanders) in May 1916, during World War I. He was awarded the Military Cross on 3 June 1916. On 10 June 1919 he married Nancy Sinclair Wemyss and they had a son and daughter: Michael Thomas Barstow and Lois Edith Barstow.

During the interwar period he served as a staff officer in India and on the Imperial General Staff as well as serving with the 1st Battalion, Black Watch.

During World War II he commanded the 69th Infantry Brigade. He died soon after leaving command of the 69th Brigade at the age of forty seven and is buried at Edrom Parish Church.

External links

British Army Officers 1939−1945
Generals of World War II

1893 births
1941 deaths
British Army personnel of World War I
Argyll and Sutherland Highlanders officers
Black Watch officers
Recipients of the Military Cross
British Army personnel killed in World War II
War Office personnel in World War II
British Army brigadiers of World War II